Frederick Walter Bevin (1880–1940) was an English footballer who played in the Football League for Wolverhampton Wanderers.

References

1880 births
1940 deaths
English footballers
Association football forwards
English Football League players
Darlaston Town F.C. players
Wolverhampton Wanderers F.C. players
Brierley Hill Alliance F.C. players
Stourbridge F.C. players
Bilston Town F.C. players